Queen of the Night is a 2013 South Korean romantic comedy film starring Kim Min-jung and Chun Jung-myung. It was written and directed by Kim Je-yeong.

Plot
Young-soo is a nerdy, timid man without any interest in women until he meets Hee-joo in a sandwich store one day. They get married and at first, the couple settles into a happy marriage. But three years later when by chance, at the reunion for his university class, the allure of winning a kimchi-fridge for her mother-in-law makes her dance a super-sexy show, the shockingly surprised Young-soo begins to doubt his seemingly perfect wife and does some digging into her past. To his dismay he discovers plenty of evidence that her past isn't as pristine as he thought. This begins to deepen the question of how this nerdy computer technician with ordinary looks and no social skills could have married such a beautiful woman who seems happily content as a sort of Stepford Wife male fantasy, the perfect virgin/whore who submissively cleans his ears but surprises him one night in a Naughty Nurse outfit and then plays it out.

Cast
 Kim Min-jung as Hee-joo
 Chun Jung-myung as Young-soo
 Kim Ki-bang as Jong-bae
 Lee Mi-do as Jeong-tae's mother
 Lee Joo-won as Moon-sook
 Ji Dae-han as Union leader 
 Han Bo-reum as Jang-mi 
 Yoon Jin-ha as MC 
 Jeong Min-jin as Seong-woo 
 Kang Seong-ho as Team leader Park 
 Kim Ah-mi as Anna 
 Jeong Yong-hee as Newcomer 
 Noh Kang-min as Jeong-tae 
 Yoo Jae-sang as young Young-soo 
 Nam Tae-boo as young Seong-woo 
 Kahlid Elijah Tapia as Gunman #1
 Han Jung-soo as Eden (cameo)
 Kim Sung-eun as Ji-eun (cameo)
 Yoo In-young as Young-soo's blind date (cameo)
 Kim Byeong-ok as Drunk at police station (cameo)
 Kim Jung-tae as Gynecologist (cameo)
 Bae Seong-woo as Security team leader (cameo)
 Park Jin-young as Locksmith (cameo)

References

External links 
  
 
 
 

2013 films
2010s Korean-language films
South Korean romantic comedy films
2013 romantic comedy films
2010s South Korean films